Hedges-Lemen House, also known as "Fort Hill," is a historic home located near Hedgesville in Berkeley County, West Virginia, United States. It is a two-story, gable roof, limestone dwelling with a central block and wing.  The central block was built in 1748 by Joshua Hedges as an Indian fort named "Fort Hill;" the wing was added in 1792.  It measures 36 feet wide by 30 feet deep and the wing measures 30 feet wide by 28 feet deep. Also on the property is a stone barn (c. 1840) and Lemen family cemetery.

It was listed on the National Register of Historic Places in 1991.

References

Houses on the National Register of Historic Places in West Virginia
Federal architecture in West Virginia
Greek Revival houses in West Virginia
Houses completed in 1748
Houses in Berkeley County, West Virginia
National Register of Historic Places in Berkeley County, West Virginia
Stone houses in West Virginia
Limestone buildings in the United States